Abdoulaye Sissako (born 26 May 1998) is a French professional footballer who plays as a midfielder for Belgian First Division A club Zulte Waregem.

International career
Sissako was a youth international for France in the past, playing at U18 and U19 level.

Personal life 
Sissako was born in France and is of Malian descent. One of his brothers, Moussa, is also a footballer, and his other brother, Souleymane, is his adviser.

References

External links 
 
 
 

Living people
1998 births
Sportspeople from Clichy, Hauts-de-Seine
Association football midfielders
French footballers
French expatriate footballers
France youth international footballers
French people of Malian descent
Ligue 2 players
Belgian Pro League players
AJ Auxerre players
LB Châteauroux players
S.V. Zulte Waregem players
French expatriate sportspeople in Belgium
Expatriate footballers in Belgium
Footballers from Hauts-de-Seine